The Sądecki Ethnographic Park (pl. - Sądecki Park Etnograficzny) is an open-air museum in Nowy Sącz.

External links 
 Main page of the museum

Open-air museums in Poland
Buildings and structures in Nowy Sącz
Museums in Lesser Poland Voivodeship